Kazimierz Ryczan (10 February 1939 – 13 September 2017) was a Polish Roman Catholic bishop.

Ordained to the priesthood on 16 June 1963, Ryczan was named bishop of the Roman Catholic Diocese of Kielce, Poland on 17 July 1993.

Pope Francis accepted his resignation on 11 October 2014.

He died on 13 December 2017.

References

1939 births
2017 deaths
People from Przemyśl County
20th-century Roman Catholic bishops in Poland
21st-century Roman Catholic bishops in Poland